Lion Heart is an association football team from Pago Pago, American Samoa. They play in the territory's top division, the FFAS Senior League.

Squad
2022 Squad

References

Football clubs in American Samoa